Growth arrest and DNA-damage-inducible proteins-interacting protein 1 is a protein that in humans is encoded by the GADD45GIP1 gene.

GADD45GIP1, also known as CRIF1 is newly identified de novo components in large subunit of mitoribosome. It is essential for the translation of mitochondrial oxidative phosphorylation (OXPHOS) polypeptides in mammalian mitochondria. CRIF1 interacts with low-sulfur (LSU) proteins, some of which surround the exit tunnel of the mitoribosome, and also interacts with nascent OXPHOS polypeptides and the mitochondrial-specific chaperone Tid1. The essential role of CRIF1 in mitochondrial synthesis and membrane integration of OXPHOS polypeptides was shown in brain-specific CRIF1-deficient mice, which exhibited profound OXPHOS failure and marked neurodegeneration.

Interactions 

GADD45GIP1 has been shown to interact with GADD45G, GADD45B and GADD45A.

References

Further reading